Edward S. Chlebek (born February 9, 1940) is an American former gridiron football player and coach. He served as the head coach at Eastern Michigan University (1976–1977), Boston College (1978–1980), and Kent State University (1981–1982), compiling a career college football record of 26–51.

Playing career
Chlebek played college football as a quarterback at Western Michigan University from 1959 to 1961. He passed for 2,290 yards in his career with the Western Michigan Broncos, including 1,109 as a senior in 1961. In 1963, Chlebek played for the New York Jets of the American Football League (AFL). He was inducted into Western Michigan University Athletic Hall of Fame.

Coaching career
Chlebek came to Eastern Michigan from the University of Notre Dame, where he was an assistant under Dan Devine and coached future Pro Football Hall of Fame quarterback Joe Montana. At Eastern Michigan, he compiled a 10–12 record from 1976 to 1977. At Boston College, he tallied a 12–21 mark and coached the only winless season in the program's history, a 0–11 campaign in 1978. From 1981 to 1982, he coached Kent State to a 4–18 record. He ended his college career on a 12-game losing streak. From Kent State he went to the Toronto Argonauts of the Canadian Football League as the offensive coordinator in 1983. The Argonauts won the Grey Cup in 1983.

Head coaching record

References

External links
 

1940 births
Living people
American football quarterbacks
American Football League players
Atlantic Coast Football League players
Boston College Eagles football coaches
Continental Football League players
Detroit Wheels coaches
Eastern Michigan Eagles football coaches
Kent State Golden Flashes football coaches
New York Jets players
Notre Dame Fighting Irish football coaches
Toronto Argonauts coaches
Western Michigan Broncos football players
United Football League (1961–1964) players
United States Football League coaches
People from Uniontown, Pennsylvania
Coaches of American football from Pennsylvania
Players of American football from Pennsylvania